The 2023 Campeonato Cearense (officially the Campeonato Cearense 1XBET 2023 for sponsorship reasons) is the 109th edition of Ceará's top professional football league organized by FCF. The competition began on 14 January and will end on 9 April 2023. Fortaleza are the defending champions.

Format
In the first stage, the 10 teams were drawn into two groups of five teams each.

Each team will play on a single round-robin tournament against the five clubs from the other group. The winners of each group will advance to the semi-finals, while the runners-up and third place will advance to the quarter-finals.

The bottom two teams of each group will play the relegation stage. The relegation stage will be played on a home-and-away round-robin basis. The bottom two teams will be relegated to 2024 Campeonato Cearense Série B.

In the first stage and the relegation stage, the teams will be ranked according to points (3 points for a win, 1 point for a draw, and 0 points for a loss). If tied on points, the following criteria will be used to determine the ranking: 1. Wins; 2. Goal difference; 3. Goals scored; 4. Fewest red cards; 5. Fewest yellow cards; 6. Draw in the headquarters of the FCF.

Quarter-finals, semi-finals and finals will be played on a home-and-away two-legged basis. If tied on aggregate, the penalty shoot-out will be used to determine the winners. For the finals, the team with best performance in the semi-finals and the first stage will host the second leg.

Champions and runners-up will qualify for the 2024 Copa do Brasil. Top three teams not already qualified for 2024 Série A, Série B or Série C will qualify for 2024 Série D.

Teams

First stage

Group A

Group B

Relegation stage

Standings and Results

Final stages

Bracket

Quarter-finals

|}

Group C

Group D

Semi-finals

|}

Group E

Group F

Finals

|}

Matches

References

Cearense
2023 in Brazilian football